Leoville is an unincorporated community in Decatur County, Kansas, United States.

History
Leoville was founded in 1885 by a colony of German Catholics. They named their community in honor of Pope Leo XIII.

Education
The community is served by Hoxie USD 412 public school district.

Leoville schools were closed through school unification. The Leoville High School mascot was Leoville Lions.

Notable people
Roman Catholic Archbishop Stephen Joseph Reichert was born in Leoville.

References

Further reading

External links
 Decatur County maps: Current, Historic, KDOT

Unincorporated communities in Decatur County, Kansas
Unincorporated communities in Kansas